Emile Leray (born September 11, 1949) is a French electrician who frequently traveled through Africa.

Education 
He received his university diploma.

Achievements 
Leray built a desert motorcycle out of the parts of a broken-down Citroën 2CV in 1993, while on a solo trip in Morocco. His car broke down in the middle of the Sahara when he accidentally hit a rock which damaged his car's chassis. He was stranded tens of kilometers from the nearest settlement, with only enough food and water to last ten days. To survive, Leray created a motorcycle out of parts of his broken-down car twelve days later. When the police finally caught with him a heavy fine was levied against him because the registration did not match the vehicle.

References

External links 

Website

1949 births
Living people
Electricians
20th-century French people
Motorcycle builders